Stephen A. C. Gorard is a British academic who specialises in the sociology of education. He is Professor of Education and Public Policy at Durham University. Stephen Gorard is the most published and cited  UK author in education, and in the top ten academic journals worldwide.

Education
Gorard was educated at Cardiff University where he was awarded a PhD in 1996 for research into private and private (fee-paying) schools in Wales.

Career and research
Gorard started his academic career in 1997, having been a secondary school teacher and leader, adult educator, computer analyst, and PhD student at Cardiff. He is Professor of Education and Public Policy, and Fellow of the Wolfson Research Institute, at Durham University.

His research has been funded by bodies including the Economic and Social Research Council (ESRC), Joseph Rowntree Foundation, Brookings Institution, Higher Education Funding Council for England (HEFCE), Qualifications and Curriculum Development Agency (QCA), the Welsh Assembly, and the Education Endowment Foundation (EEF).

Gorard has given written and verbal evidence to various parliamentary select committees. He has contributed regularly stories and articles to all forms the media. including Times Educational Supplement. Gorard has been granted the title of Fellow of the Academy of Social Sciences. The British Educational Research Association (BERA) has included his work as one of the landmark studies that have had a significant impact on British educational policy and teaching practices. He has also been a member of the ESRC Grant Assessment Panel for Education, and a Fellow of the Royal Society of Arts.

He is the author of over 1,000 books, articles and chapters, and his work on educational inequality forms part of the A level Sociology syllabus.

Publications
His book publications include:

 Siddiqui, N. and Gorard, S. (Eds) (2022) Making your doctoral research project ambitious: Developing large-scale studies with real-world impact, Abingdon: Routledge, 978-1-032-05975-4 (hardback), 978-1-032-06245-7 (paperback), 978-1-003-20136-6 (ebook) 
 Gorard, S. (2021) How to make sense of statistics: Everything you need to know about using numbers in social science, London: SAGE, ISBN hardback 9781526413819, paperback 9781526413826, ebook 9781529755862
 Gorard, S. (2020 Ed.) Getting evidence into education: Evaluating the routes to policy and practice, London: Routledge, ISBN hardback 9780367258801, paperback 978036728832, ebook 9780429290343
 Gorard, S. (2018) Education policy: Evidence of equity and effectiveness, Bristol: Policy Press, 224 pages
 Gorard, S., See, BH and Siddiqui, N. (2017) The trials of evidence-based education, London: Routledge, 200 pages
 Gorard, S. and See, BH. (2013) Overcoming disadvantage in education, London: Routledge, 224 pages
 Gorard, S. (2013) Research Design: Robust approaches for the social sciences, London:SAGE, 218 pages
 Gorard, S. and Smith, E. (2010) Equity in Education: an international comparison of pupil perspectives, London: Palgrave, 256 pages
 Gorard, S. (2008, Ed.) Quantitative research in education: Volumes 1 to 3, London: Sage, 1264 pages
 Gorard, S., with Adnett, N., May, H., Slack, K., Smith, E. and Thomas, L. (2007) Overcoming barriers to HE, Stoke-on-Trent: Trentham Books,  (paperback), 190 pages
 Gorard, S., See, BH., Smith, E. and White, P. (2006) Teacher supply: the key issues, London: Continuum,  (hardback), 194 pages
 Gorard, S. (2006) Using everyday numbers effectively in research: Not a book about statistics, London: Continuum,  (paperback), 94 pages
 Selwyn, N., Gorard, S. and Furlong, J. (2006) Adult learning in the digital age, London: RoutledgeFalmer,  (paperback),  (hardback), 229 pages
 Gorard, S., with Taylor, C. (2004) Combining methods in educational and social research, London: Open University Press,  (paperback),  (hardback), 198 pages
 Gorard, S., Taylor, C. and Fitz, J. (2003) Schools, Markets and Choice Policies, London: RoutledgeFalmer,  (paperback),  (hardback), 226 pages
 Gorard, S. (2003) Quantitative methods in social science: the role of numbers made easy, London: Continuum,  (paperback),  (hardback), 252 pages
 Gorard, S. and Rees, G. (2002) Creating a learning society?, Bristol: Policy Press,  (paperback),  (hardback), 192 pages
 Gorard, S. and Selwyn, N. (2002) Information Technology, New York: McGraw Hill, 112 pages
 Selwyn, N. and Gorard, S. (2002) The information age: technology, learning and social exclusion in Wales, Cardiff: University of Wales Press, 226 pages
 Gorard, S. (2001) Quantitative Methods in Educational Research: The role of numbers made easy, London: Continuum,  (paperback),  (hardback), 200 pages
 Gorard, S. and Selwyn, N. (2001) Information Technology, London: Hodder and Stoughton, 104 pages
 Gorard, S. (2000) Education and Social Justice, Cardiff: University of Wales Press, 242 pages
 Gorard, S. (1997) School Choice in an Established Market, Aldershot: Ashgate, 271 pages

His journal articles include:

 Gorard, S., Ventista, O., Morris, R. and See, B. (2021) Who wants to be a teacher? Findings from a survey of undergraduates in England, Educational Studies, https://www.tandfonline.com/doi/full/10.1080/03055698.2021.1915751
 Gorard, S., Siddiqui, N. and See, BH (2021) Assessing the impact of Pupil Premium funding on primary school segregation and attainment, Research Papers in Education, https://doi.org/10.1080/02671522.2021.1907775
 See, BH, Gorard, S., Siddiqui, N., El Soufi, N., Lu, B. and Dong, L. (2021) A systematic review of technology-mediated parental engagement on student outcomes, Educational Research and Evaluation, Full article: A systematic review of the impact of technology-mediated parental engagement on student outcomes (tandfonline.com)
 See, BH, Gorard, S., Lu, B., Dong, L. and Siddiqui, N. (2021) Is technology always helpful?: A critical review of the use of education technology in supporting formative assessment in schools, Research Papers in Education, https://doi.org/10.1080/02671522.2021.1907778
 See, BH, Morris, R., Gorard, S. and El Soufi, N. (2021) Recruiting and retaining teachers: what works? Researching Education, 2, 1, doi.org/10.5281/zenodo.4550903
 Boliver, V., Gorard, S. and Siddiqui, N. (2021) Using contextual data to widen access to higher education, Perspectives: Policy and Practice in Higher Education, 25, 1, 7-13, https://doi.org/10.1080/13603108.2019.1678076
 Zelinsky, T., Gorard, S. and Siddiqui, N. (2021) Increasing understanding of the aspirations and expectations of Roma students, British Journal of Sociology of Education, 42, 4, 588-606 https://doi.org/10.1080/01425692.2021.1872366
 Gorard, S. (2020) Handling missing data in numeric analyses, International Journal of Social Research Methods, 23, 6, 651-660, https://www.tandfonline.com/doi/full/10.1080/13645579.2020.1729974
 Gorard, S., See, BH and Siddiqui, N. (2020) What is the evidence on the best way to get evidence into use in education?, Review of Education, DOI: 10.1002/REV3.3200
 Gorard, S., Siddiqui, N. and See, BH (2019) The difficulties of judging what difference the Pupil Premium has made to school intakes and outcomes in England, Research Papers in Education, https://www.tandfonline.com/doi/full/10.1080/02671522.2019.1677759
 Gorard, S. and Siddiqui, N. (2019) How trajectories of disadvantage help explain school attainment, SAGE Open, https://journals.sagepub.com/doi/10.1177/2158244018825171
 Gorard, S., Boliver, V., Siddiqui, N. and Banerjee, P. (2019) Which are the most suitable contextual indicators for use in widening participation to HE?, Research Papers in Education, 34, 1, 99-129, https://doi.org/10.1080/02671522.2017.1402083
 Gorard, S. and Siddiqui, N. (2018) Grammar schools in England: a new analysis of social segregation and academic outcomes, British Journal of Sociology of Education, 39, 7, 909-924, https://doi.org/10.1080/01425692.2018.1443432

References 

British educational theorists
Living people
Year of birth missing (living people)